Catmose House is a municipal facility in Catmose Street in Oakham, Rutland, England. The house, which is the headquarters of Rutland County Council, is a Grade II listed building.

History
The house was designed as a hunting lodge known as Catmose Lodge and was completed in 1781. It became the home of Sir Gerard Noel Edwards, MP for Rutland in the early 19th century. It passed to Edwards' son Charles Noel, 1st Earl of Gainsborough in 1838 and then to Edwards' grandson, the Rt Hon Gerard James Noel, also MP for Rutland, in 1866. Gerard Noel substantially rebuilt the house laid out the gardens as well, in the 1870s. The design of the building, following the rebuilding, involved a main frontage of eight bays facing north east; there were round-headed windows on the ground floor and square windows on the first floor with a pediment containing a clock above. 

In 1936, following a debate, Rutland County Council chose by 18 votes to 6 votes to leave their previous facilities at Oakham Castle and to acquire Catmose House for use as their new headquarters. Changes were made to the property including the installation of a council chamber in a room with a marble fireplace and the conversion of part of the garden into a car park. Following changes to the layout of the building, the main access was from the south east, through a stone porch with an arched entrance; there was a balustrade above the porch and a window on the first floor.

After implementation of the Local Government Act 1972, when Rutland was reconstituted as a district of Leicestershire, it became the local district headquarters. Then, following the re-incarnation of Rutland County Council in April 1997, it became the headquarters of the new unitary authority. A large extension was built to the north west of the house. When the police station in Station Road was closed, a local police enquiry desk opened in January 2015 in the reception area. The old police station was sold in 2016.

Works of art in the building include a painting by Dorothy Snowdon (1921–2014) depicting an osprey.

Notes

References

Grade II listed buildings in Rutland
County halls in England
Government buildings completed in 1781
Oakham